Anzac Peak is a  volcano on the Laurens Peninsula of Heard Island in the Southern Ocean. It lies to the northwest of Mawson Peak. Despite its low elevation of just over 700 metres high, the peak and several neighbouring peaks have permanent snow and ice, like the Jacka Glacier with several icefalls.

See also
List of volcanoes in Antarctica
List of volcanoes in Australia

References

External links
Click here to see a map of Heard Island and McDonald Islands, including all major topographical features

Mountains of Australia
Volcanoes of Heard Island and McDonald Islands
ANZAC (Australia)